Paris By Night 83: Những Khúc Hát Ân Tình is a Paris By Night program that was filmed at the Charles M. Schulz Theatre at Knott's Berry Farm in Buena Park, California on Saturday, May 27, 2006. It is the first program to be released to a 3-disc DVD format on Thursday, September 21, 2006. The first two discs are Part I and Part II of the music program. And the third disc is special features, mainly documentaries about the composers featured in this program. The third disc also includes two bonus MTV music videos.

This program is dedicated to three famous Vietnamese composers, Xuân Tiên, Thanh Sơn, and Nguyễn Ánh 9.

Track list
Disc 1

XUÂN TIÊN

01. Khúc Hát Ân Tình - Như Quỳnh, Hà Phương, Minh Tuyết, Hạ Vy

02. Phóng Sự Nhạc Sĩ Xuân Tiên

03.  Chờ Một Kiếp Mai - Trần Thái Hòa

04. Chờ Anh Bên Đồi - Như Quỳnh

05. Duyên Tình - Ý Lan

06. Mong Chờ - Hoàng Oanh

07. Về Dưới Mái Nhà - Trần Thái Hòa, Quang Lê, Thế Sơn

THANH SƠN

08. Nhật Ký Đời Tôi - Mạnh Quỳnh, Hạ Vy

09. Phóng Sự Nhạc Sĩ Thanh Sơn

10. Nhạc Sĩ Thanh Sơn & Hương Lan Lúc Tập Dợt

11. Hoài Cổ - Hương Lan

12. Mùa Hoa Anh Đào - Dương Triệu Vũ

13. Bài Ngợi Ca Quê Hương - Thái Châu, Sơn Ca

14. Phóng Sự Nhạc Sĩ Thanh Sơn : Thời Thơ Ấu

15. Thương Ca Mùa Hạ - Minh Tuyết

16. Hương Tóc Mạ Non - Quang Lê, Hà Phương

17. Phóng Sự Nhạc Sĩ Thanh Sơn : Trở Thành Ca Sĩ

18. Thị Trấn Mù Sương - Hương Thủy

19. Mười Năm Tái Ngộ - Mạnh Quỳnh, Mạnh Đình

20. Phóng Sự Nhạc Sĩ Thanh Sơn : Lời Tâm Sự Cuối Cùng

21. Liên Khúc : Nỗi Buồn Hoa Phượng & Lưu Bút Ngày Xanh - Hoàng Oanh, Hương Lan, Như Quỳnh

Disc 2

NGUYỄN ÁNH 9

01. Hài Kịch : Tình Quê - Kiều Oanh, Lê Tín

02. Phóng Sự Nhạc Sĩ Nguyễn Ánh 9

03. Tình Yêu Đến Trong Giã Từ - Hồ Lệ Thu

04. Tài Liệu Nhạc Sĩ Đặng Lê Quân Và Bài Không

05. Không - Elvis Phương

06. Nhạc Sĩ Nguyễn Ánh 9 & Khánh Ly Lúc Tập Dợt

07. Mùa Thu Cánh Nâu - Khánh Ly

08. Ai Đưa Em Về - Ngọc Liên, Lương Tùng Quang

09. Buồn Ơi, Chào Mi - Bằng Kiều

10. Biệt Khúc - Khánh Hà

11. Bơ Vơ - Lưu Bích

12. Một Lời Cuối Cho Em - Thế Sơn

13. Trọn Kiếp Đơn Côi - Nguyễn Hưng

14. Nhạc Sĩ Nguyễn Ánh 9 & Các Ca Sĩ Lúc Tập Dợt

15. Tình Khúc Chiều Mưa - Bằng Kiều, Lương Tùng Quang, Trần Thái Hòa, Minh Tuyết, Ngọc Liên, Angela Trâm Anh

16. Phóng Sự Nhạc Sĩ Nguyễn Ánh 9 : Lời Tâm Sự Cuối Cùng

17. Cô Đơn - Trần Thu Hà

18. Finale

Disc 3

01. Bonus MTV : Hãy Về Đây Bên Anh - Quang Lê

02. Bonus MTV : Gọi Đò - Tường Nguyên 

03. Phóng Sự Bổ Túc Nhạc Sĩ Xuân Tiên

04. Phóng Sự Bổ Túc Nhạc Sĩ Thanh Sơn

05. Phóng Sự Bổ Túc Nhạc Sĩ Nguyễn Ánh 9

06. Hậu Trường Sân Khấu (Behind The Scenes)

Paris by Night

vi:Paris By Night 83